Don Special (दोन स्पेशल, टचस्क्रीनच्या गर्दीतून शाईपेनच्या दुनियेत नेणारा) is a marathi play set in December 1989. The story of Milind Bhagwat that takes place in a newspaper office in Pune.

Cast 
 Writer: Kshitij Patwardhan
 Director: Kshitij Patwardhan
 Cast : Girija Oak Godbole, Jitendra Joshi &  Rohit Haldikar
 Producer: Santosh Bharat Kanekar & Jeetendra Joshi
 Production House: Atharv theaters

References

 http://www.india.com/marathi/entertainment/jitendra-joshi-and-girija-oak-godbole-come-thogether-for-marathi-play-don-special/
 http://www.mumbaitheatreguide.com/dramas/marathi/don-special-marathi-play-preview.asp

Indian plays